Legacy of Ashes is the ninth studio album by Dutch death metal band Sinister. It was released on December 17, 2010 through Massacre Records.

Track listing

Personnel
Sinister
Aad Kloosterwaard - Vocals
Alex Paul - Guitars, Bass
Edwin van den Eeden - Drums

Production
Mike Hrubovcak - Cover art
Jörg Uken - Producer

References

2010 albums
Sinister (band) albums
Massacre Records albums